Between 1956 and 1965 Radio Free Scotland (RFS) broadcast through the PAL audio channel of BBC television (then on VHF) after God Save the Queen finished in the evening, and, later on, on 262 metres medium wave on the radio.

The station was the initiative of David Rollo, an electrical engineer who served as the Scottish National Party (SNP)'s treasurer and head of broadcasting.  He built a transmitter in the Townhead Cafe in Kirkintilloch with Alvaro Rossi.

The first broadcast interrupted a BBC newscast when viewers in Perth were told to stay tuned following sign off. This "pirate" radio transmission opened with the provocative statement: "This is Radio Free Scotland proclaiming to the nation that the fight for independence is on in earnest". This roving station was heard for almost a month in Glasgow, Ayrshire and Perth. The Scottish National Party (SNP) announced official backing for Radio Free Scotland because of the government ban on broadcasts by the Scottish and Welsh nationalists on the BBC.

The BBC later paid for the right to re-broadcast some RFS material and the SNP and Plaid Cymru gained the right, as other parties already had, to time on mainstream broadcasters.

Leading figures in Radio Free Scotland included "Controller General", Gordon Wilson, who later became an MP (1974–1987) and was Chairman (Convener) of the SNP from 1979 to 1990. Douglas Henderson, also later an MP, was "Director of Programmes" between 1963 and 1965. Scotland's oldest woman when she died, Annie Knight, hosted the station in her living room during 1962.

Gordon Wilson has written a book about the station, Pirates of the Air.

Radio Free Scotland was reborn online in 2007 after the blessing of William Wolfe and others from the original station was given to Presenter "Pax". The station was presented for the first run by Pax himself with occasional guests providing music and opinion relevant to Scottish independence. Every show still starts with opening words from the original broadcasts.

Pax was diagnosed with cancer and went through several treatments for it and the show went off air for a while. After successful treatment the show was back on, this time with co-host Norrie and the double act was born. In late 2014 Pax was diagnosed with Gulf War Syndrome with chronic obstructive pulmonary disorder presenting as the main symptom. His treatment continues.

In 2013 the show was revamped again to include regular guests Nick Durie and Gordon S. Kerman giving their own views and insights along Yes Scotland Edinburgh  Pentlands co-ordinator Simon Hayter giving monthly updates both nationally and regionally for the Yes Scotland campaign.

The station has an account on Facebook, although it has been inactive since December 2014.

References

External links

Details of book launch of Pirates of the Air - http://news.scotsman.com/politics/Pirates-of-the-Caledonian-Uncovering.6842505.jp 
Radio Free Scotland Facebook page - https://www.facebook.com/Radio.Free.Scotland

Radio stations in Scotland
Scottish independence
Pirate radio stations in the United Kingdom
Scottish National Party
Defunct radio stations in the United Kingdom
Radio stations established in 1956
Radio stations disestablished in 1965